David Philip Hefti (born 1975) is a Swiss composer and conductor.

Career
Born in St. Gallen, Hefti studied composition, conducting, clarinet and chamber music with Wolfgang Rihm, Cristóbal Halffter, Wolfgang Meyer, Rudolf Kelterborn and Elmar Schmid in Zürich and Karlsruhe. He has appeared on five continents at festivals such as Ultraschall in Berlin, Schleswig-Holstein Musik Festival, Heidelberger Frühling, Musica de Hoy in Madrid, Wien Modern,  in Graz, Menuhin in Gstaad, Dvorak-Festival in Prague, Beijing Modern, Suntory in Tokyo and as the composer-in-residence at the Moritzburg Festival, at the Schlossmediale Werdenberg and with the Heidelberg Philharmonic. He has worked with soloists such as Juliane Banse, Fabio Di Càsola, Mojca Erdmann, Thomas Grossenbacher, Viviane Hagner, Cornelia Kallisch, Wolfgang Meyer, Sylvia Nopper, Lawrence Power, Hartmut Rohde, Baiba Skride, Jan Vogler, Antje Weithaas and with conductors such as Douglas Boyd, Péter Eötvös, Howard Griffiths, Cornelius Meister, Kent Nagano, Jonathan Nott, Michael Sanderling, Jac van Steen, Mario Venzago, Ralf Weikert and David Zinman.

Hefti is the winner of the prestigious composition competitions Gustav Mahler in Vienna, Pablo Casals in Prades, George Enescu in Bucharest and was awarded the Hindemith Prize, the Ernst von Siemens Composers' Prize and the Composer Award of the International Classical Music Awards (ICMA).

Sources
David Philip Hefti, Edition Peters
Hefti, David Philip, Edition Kunzelmann

External links

1975 births
21st-century classical composers
Ernst von Siemens Composers' Prize winners
Living people
People from St. Gallen (city)
Swiss classical composers
Swiss male classical composers
21st-century male musicians
21st-century Swiss composers